Tanzania is administratively divided into thirty-one regions (mkoa).

History

 In 1975, Tanzania had 25 regions. In the 1970s, the name of the Ziwa Magharibi Region (West Lake Region) changed to Kagera Region.
 In 2002, Manyara Region was created out of part of Arusha Region.
 In 2012, four regions were created: Geita, Katavi, Njombe, and Simiyu.
 In 2016, Songwe Region was created from the western part of Mbeya Region.

List of regions
Tanzania is subdivided into 31 regions (as of 2016).

See also
Districts of Tanzania
List of regions of Tanzania by GDP
ISO 3166-2:TZ

Notes

References

 
Subdivisions of Tanzania
Tanzania, Regions
Tanzania 1
Regions, Tanzania
Tanzania geography-related lists